Monroeville is a home rule municipality in Allegheny County, Pennsylvania, United States. It is a suburb with mixed residential and commercial developments located about 10 miles east of Pittsburgh. As of the 2020 census, Monroeville was home to 28,640 people.

History

Named for Joel Monroe, the area's first postmaster, Monroeville was settled in the mid to late 18th century. The area was incorporated as Patton Township in 1849 before becoming the borough of Monroeville on January 25, 1951. Monroeville became a Home Rule Charter Municipality on May 21, 1974.

Geography

Surrounding and inner communities
Monroeville has nine borders, including Plum to the north, Murrysville in Westmoreland County to the east, Penn Township in Westmoreland County to the southeast, Trafford in Westmoreland County to the south, North Versailles, Wilmerding and Turtle Creek to the southwest, Wilkins Township to the west, and Penn Hills to the northwest.  Also, the borough of Pitcairn is entirely situated inside Monroeville in the south-southwest area.

Demographics

As of the census of 2010 there were 28,386 people in Monroeville. The racial makeup of the city was 79.51% White, 12.58% African American, 6.07% Asian, 0.42% from other races. Hispanic or Latino of any race were 1.41% of the population. Monroeville is one of the most racially diverse places in the Pittsburgh area.

As of the census of 2000, there were 29,349 people, 12,376 households, and 8,044 families residing in the city. The population density was 1,483.0 people per square mile (572.6/km2). There were 13,159 housing units at an average density of 664.9 per square mile (256.7/km2). The racial makeup of the city was 85.58% White, 8.29% African American, 0.14% Native American, 4.41% Asian, 0.04% Pacific Islander, 0.30% from other races, and 1.23% from two or more races. Hispanic or Latino of any race were 0.77% of the population.

There were 12,376 households, out of which 25.8% had children under the age of 18 living with them, 52.7% were married couples living together, 9.7% had a female householder with no husband present, and 35.0% were non-families. 30.8% of all households were made up of individuals, and 12.1% had someone living alone who was 65 years of age or older. The average household size was 2.30 and the average family size was 2.89.

In the city the population was spread out, with 20.4% under the age of 18, 6.2% from 18 to 24, 27.4% from 25 to 44, 25.8% from 45 to 64, and 20.3% who were 65 years of age or older. The median age was 43 years. For every 100 females, there were 88.5 males. For every 100 females age 18 and over, there were 84.8 males.

The median income for a household in the borough was $44,653, and the median income for a family was $53,474. Males had a median income of $41,100 versus $30,232 for females. The per capita income for the borough was $24,031. About 4.9% of families and 6.6% of the population were below the poverty line, including 9.4% of those under age 18 and 6.1% of those age 65 or over.

Economy

Monroeville is home to the Monroeville Mall as well as several office parks, and since the 1960s has featured high rise hotels. The Monroeville Convention Center, formerly known as the ExpoMart, is located near the mall.  At its height in 1979, U.S. Steel's research laboratory in Monroeville employed nearly 1,800 people.

Government and politics

Elected officials
 Mayor — Nick Gresock 
 Ward 1 Council — Jospeh Hyzy
 Ward 2 Council — Eric Poach
 Ward 3 Council — Bob Stevenson
 Ward 4 Council — Steve Wolfram
 Ward 5 Council — Mike Adams
 Ward 6 Council — Bob Williams
 Ward 7 Council — Denis Biondo
 Tax Collector — Pat Fulkerson

Education
K-12 students in Monroeville are served by the Gateway School District, a public school district with a student population of 3,800. Higher education is accessible via the Community College of Allegheny County's Boyce Campus and Indiana University of Pennsylvania's satellite facility in Penn Center East.  The Western School of Health and Business - Monroeville is also located in Monroeville.

Transportation
U.S. Route 22 ran through Monroeville as a substantial business route.  When the Parkway East (I-376) was extended east to connect to the Pennsylvania Turnpike, U.S. 22 was shifted to that road, and the original U.S. 22 stretch of William Penn Highway became Business U.S. 22. Today, U.S. Route 22 runs through the municipality, serving as its main business district. This highway, along with the Pennsylvania Turnpike (Interstate 76), the eastern portion of the Penn-Lincoln Parkway (Interstate 376 concurrent with U.S. 22), U.S. Route 22 Business, and PA Route 48 intersect in Monroeville. Exit 57 (old Exit 6) of the Pennsylvania Turnpike is in Monroeville, with its interchange to Interstate 376.  U.S. Route 22 also has an interchange with PA Route 286, which serves the northeastern part of the municipality.

Two bus lines of the Pittsburgh Regional Transit offer service to downtown Pittsburgh, and maintains several park-and-ride lots located in Monroeville for bus commuters to Pittsburgh.

Passenger rail service by Amtrak's Pennsylvanian passes through once daily in each direction on the Pittsburgh Line, but does not call in Monroeville.  Many freight trains arrive via the same track to Norfolk Southern's Pitcairn Intermodal Terminal which straddles the Monreoville-North Versailles border in the Turtle Creek valley.  U. S. Steel's Union Railroad runs along its own track through the Thompson Run valley between Wilkins Township and Monroeville, where it has one of its facilities.

The Westmoreland Heritage Trail is a rail-trail that connects cyclists and pedestrians in Monroeville to neighboring Trafford and Murrysville along the right of way where the Turtle Creek Industrial Railroad once ran.

In popular culture
 In the NBC television show Scrubs, Dr. Robert 'Bob' Kelso claims that his family, then named Kelsonovich, settled in Monroeville.
 The 2008 movie Zack and Miri Make a Porno, directed by Kevin Smith, is set in Monroeville. Filming was done at the Monroeville Mall and Monroeville Municipal Building. The film features a fictional recreational hockey team named the Monroeville Zombies, a reference to the George A. Romero film.
 The My Chemical Romance song "Early Sunsets Over Monroeville" from their debut album I Brought You My Bullets, You Brought Me Your Love was inspired by the classic George A. Romero horror film, Dawn of the Dead. In the film, the protagonists find reprieve from the zombie apocalypse by shutting themselves into Monroeville Mall.

Notable people
 Andy Dick, comedian, resided in Monroeville in his teenage years
 Roger Kingdom, Olympic gold medalist
 Gene Ludwig, jazz organist
 Marilyn Suzanne Miller, writer; graduated from Gateway High School in 1967.

See also 
 Monroeville Public Library

References

Further reading
 Getting Around: A History of Travel in Monroeville, by Louis Chandler

External links

 Municipality of Monroeville official website
 Monroeville Public Library
 Monroeville Municipal Authority
 Monroeville Historical Society

1765 establishments in Pennsylvania
Boroughs in Allegheny County, Pennsylvania
Boroughs in Pennsylvania
Home Rule Municipalities in Allegheny County, Pennsylvania
Populated places established in 1765